Campo Alegre de Lourdes is a municipality in the state of Bahia in the North-East region of Brazil. It is located at the north of the state on the border of Bahia and Piauí.

See also
List of municipalities in Bahia

References

Municipalities in Bahia